Monochamus obtusus is a species of beetle in the family Cerambycidae. It was described by Casey in 1891.

Subspecies
 Monochamus obtusus fulvomaculatus Linsley & Chemsak, 1983
 Monochamus obtusus obtusus Casey, 1891

References

obtusus
Beetles described in 1891